William Higgins may refer to:

Sports
Alexander Higgins (footballer, born 1870) (1870–?), born William Alexander Higgins, English footballer
William Higgins (English cricketer) (1850–1926), English cricketer
William Higgins (New Zealand cricketer) (1888–1968), New Zealand cricketer
William Higgins (rugby league), rugby league footballer of the 1900s for Wales League XIII, and Ebbw Vale
William Higgins (tennis), American tennis player of the 1960s and 1970s in 1971 US Open – Men's Singles
William S. Higgins, coach for the Gonzaga University men's basketball and football teams
Bill Higgins (baseball) (1859–1919), American baseball player
Bill Higgins (basketball) (born 1952), American basketball player
 Bill Higgins (hurler), Irish hurler
Billy Higgins (karateka) (born 1945), British karateka
Billy Higgins (Scottish footballer) (born 1940), Scottish footballer
Billy Higgins (English footballer) (1924–1981), English football winger

Politicians
William J. Higgins (1880–1943), lawyer, judge and political figure in Newfoundland
William L. Higgins (1867–1951), U.S. Representative from Connecticut

Others
William Higgins (chemist) (1763–1825), Irish chemist
William Higgins (director) (1942–2019), American director of gay pornographic films
William R. Higgins (1945–1990), United States Marine Corps colonel, killed in Lebanon
William Victor Higgins (1884–1949), American painter and teacher
Billy Higgins (vaudeville) (1888–1937),  American vaudeville entertainer
Billy Higgins (1936–2001), American jazz drummer
William Higgins (high constable), first high constable of Toronto
William Higgins (priest) (died 1666), Anglican priest

See also 
William Higgins Coleman (1812–1863), English botanist